Prentice is both a given name and a surname. Notable people with the name include:

Given name
Abra Prentice Wilkin (born 1942), American philanthropist
 Nathaniel Prentice Banks (1816–1894), American politician and soldier
 Prentice Cooper (1895–1969), American politician
 Prentice Delaney (1945–2003),  American musician, producer, road manager, and songwriter
 Derrick Prentice Barry (born 1983), American drag queen and Britney Spears impersonator
 Prentice E. Sanders (1937-2021), American police chief
 Prentice Gautt (1938–2005), American football running back
 Prentice Marshall (1926–2004), United States District judge on the United States District Court for the Northern District of Illinois
 Prentice McCray (born 1951),  former American football safety in the National Football League
 Prentice Moreland (1925–1988), American rhythm and blues singer
 Prentice Mulford (1834–1891), American literary humorist
 Prentice Redman (born 1979), American professional baseball player

Surname
 Adam Prentice (born 1997), American football player
 Alta Rockefeller Prentice (1871–1962), American activist
 Andrew Prentice (21st century), Australian mathematician
 Beatrice Prentice (20th century), American stage actress
 Bill Prentice (born 1950), retired Canadian professional ice hockey forward
 Bridget Prentice (born 1952), politician in the United Kingdom
 Chris Prentice (born 1953),former British Luger in the winter Olympics
 Christopher Prentice (born 1954), British diplomat
 Clarrie Prentice (20th century), Australian rugby union and rugby league player
 David Prentice (born 1936), English artist
 David R. Prentice (born 1943), American artist
 Dean Prentice (born 1932), retired professional ice hockey left wing
 Eric Prentice (1926–2002), professional ice hockey left winger
 George D. Prentice (1802–1870), American newspaper editor
 Gordon Prentice (born 1951), politician in the United Kingdom
 Jessica Prentice (21st century), American chef
 Jim Prentice (1956–2016), Canadian politician and 16th Premier of Alberta
 John Prentice (disambiguation), various people
 John Prentice (cartoonist) (1920–1999), American cartoonist
 John Prentice (footballer, born 1926) (1926–2006), Scottish football player and manager
 John Rockefeller Prentice (1902–1972), United States Army officer
 Jordan Prentice (born 1973), Canadian dwarf actor
 Judson Prentice (1810–1886), member of the Wisconsin State Senate
 Justin Prentice (born 1994), American actor 
 Keith Prentice (1940–1992), American soap opera actor
 Leslie Prentice (1886–1928), Australian-born English cricketer
 Levi Wells Prentice (1851–1935), American still life and landscape painter
 Margarita Prentice (21st century), Washington State Senator
 Mitchell Prentice (born 1983), Australian football (soccer) player
 Reg Prentice (1923–2001), politician in the United Kingdom
 Tim Prentice (designer), industrial designer
 Tim Prentice (sculptor) (21st century), kinetic sculptor
 Travis Prentice (born 1976), former American football running back
 Keith Prentice (born 1954), World Senior Curling Champion (2007)

Fictional characters
 Dr. Peter Prentice, on the show The Mindy Project, portrayed by Adam Pally
Dr. John Prentice, fictional character on the soap opera General Hospital
 Prentice McHoan, the protagonist of Iain Banks' 1992 novel The Crow Road
Prentice Endal, an elf from the series Keeper of the Lost Cities by Shannon Messenger